The silver-beaked tanager (Ramphocelus carbo) is a medium-sized passerine bird. This tanager is a resident breeder in South America from eastern Colombia and Venezuela south to Paraguay and central Brazil, Perú  and on Trinidad.  It is common and conspicuous.

Adult males are velvety crimson black with a deep crimson throat and breast. The upper mandible of the bill is black, but the enlarged lower mandible is bright silver in appearance. The bill is pointed upwards in display. The female is much duller, with brownish upperparts, reddish brown underparts and a black bill.

There is considerable plumage variation between the various subspecies, differing mainly in the degree of contrast between the upperparts and the throat and breast.

It occurs in light woodland and cultivated areas. The bulky cup nest is usually built in a bush, and the normal clutch is two green-blue eggs blotched with black-brown. The female incubates the eggs for 11–13 days before they hatch. The chicks fledge after another 11–12 days.

Individuals may live at least 11 years in the wild.

These are social birds which eat mainly fruit, but vines, nectar, short grass and insects are also taken. The silver-beaked tanager is often seen in groups of six to ten, frequently giving a call described as cheeng. Its song is a slow thin kick-wick.

The silver-beaked tanager was first described by the German naturalist Peter Simon Pallas in 1764 and given the binomial name Lanius carbo.

References

Bibliography

External links

Page with photos and a sound file – from the Birds of Suriname
 Silver-beaked Tanager videos, photos & sounds on the Internet Bird Collection
Stamps (for Suriname) with RangeMap
Photo; Article – borderland-tours
Silver-beaked Tanager photo gallery VIREO Photo-High Res-(shows black/ silver bill)

silver-beaked tanager
Birds of South America
silver-beaked tanager
Taxa named by Peter Simon Pallas